Andenne is a city and municipality of Wallonia located in the province of Namur, Belgium. 

On January 1, 2006, Andenne had a total population of 25,240. The total area is 86.17 km² which gives a population density of 292 inhabitants per km². The municipality, and the central city, extend on both sides of the river Meuse.

The municipality consists of the following districts: Andenne, Bonneville, Coutisse, Landenne, Maizeret, Namêche, Sclayn, Seilles, Thon-Samson, and Vezin.

History
The city is symbolized by a bear, originating from the legend that saw Charles Martel, while still a child, use a hammer to kill a bear that terrorized the inhabitants.

Andenne is the location of the Château du Moisnil.

Andenne is associated with the Rape of Belgium in 1914, during which between 211 and 225 townspeople were massacred. German troops entered the area on August 18, 1914 but discovered all the bridges into town had been blown to deny them crossing. Construction of a pontoon bridge commenced, and the next day the Germans entered. At first no serious conflicts arose; apart from some German soldiers looting shops, mainly taverns and inns. Civilians were frightened and hid. When the main army arrived the civilians began panicking causing them to be rounded up and forced out into the streets. From there they were taken to the main square, where they were berated for what Belgian soldiers and civilians had done to the German's "brothers". As revenge all were shot, or killed with axes.

One German soldier’s diary was discovered near Andenne, stating: "19th August, Our cavalry patrols, we hear, are being shot at in the villages again and again. Several poor fellows have already lost their lives. Disgraceful! An honest bullet in honest battle – yes, then one has shed one’s blood for the Fatherland. But to be shot from an ambush, from the window of a house, the gun barrel hidden behind flowerpots, no, that is not a nice, soldierly death."

Notable individuals 

 Saint Begga, daughter of Pepin of Landen and mother of Pepin of Heristal, founded a convent in Andenne of which she was the first abbess.  She is buried in Saint Begga's Collegiate Church in Andenne.
 Cécile de France, actress
 Carl Johan Frederik Jakhelln, Norwegian diplomat and writer
 Fats Sadi, jazz musician

Gallery

See also
 List of protected heritage sites in Andenne
Maizeret
Château du Moisnil

References

External links 

 Information and pictures about Andenne (English pages)

 
Cities in Wallonia
Municipalities of Namur (province)